The 2016–17 season will be Al-Minaa's 41st season in the Iraqi Premier League, having featured in all 43 editions of the competition except two. Al-Minaa are participating in the Iraqi Premier League and the Iraq FA Cup.

They enter this season having finished in a disappointing sixth place in the league in the 2015–16 season, and will be looking to wrestle back the title they won in the 1977–78 season.

Squad

Transfers

In

Out
{| class="wikitable"
|-
! Date
! Pos.
! Name
! To
! Fee
|-
| June 2016
| MF
|  Abdul Hadi Zaqlam
| End of contract
| –
|-
| June 2016
| FW
|  Ali Al-Shareef
| End of contract
| –
|-
| June 2016
| FW
|  Gleisson Freire
| End of contract
| –
|-
| June 2016
| MF
|  Ali Hosni
|  Çaykur Rizespor
| –
|-
| June 2016
| FW
|  Ziyad Ahmed
|   Naft Al-Wasat
| –
|-
| June 2016
| MF
|  Ahmed Jabbar
|   Naft Al-Wasat
| –
|-
| June 2016
| GK
|  Saqr Ajail
|   Amanat Baghdad
| –
|-
| June 2016
| GK
|  Medhat Abdul Hussein
|   Al-Bahri
| –
|-
| June 2016
| MF
|  Ahmad Abbas Hattab
|  Naft Al-Janoob
| –
|-
| June 2016
| MF
|  Jawad Kadhim
|  Al-Shorta
| –
|-
| July 2016
| DF
|  Ali Bahjat
|   Al-Quwa Al-Jawiya
| –
|-
| July 2016
| MF
|  Faisal Jassim
|  Al-Shorta
| –
|-
| July 2016
| DF
|  Omar Midani
||  Al-Wahda
| –
|-
| September 2016
| DF
|  Saad Attiya
|   Zakho
| –
|-
| November 2016
| FW
|  David Rugamas
| Released
|  –
|-
| November 2016
| FW
|  Ricardinho
| Released
|  –
|-
| December 2016
| DF
|  Ali Mohammed Alialah
| Released
|  –
|-
| December 2016
| MF
|  Mustafa Hussein
| Released
|  –
|-
| December 2016
| MF
|  Safaa Hadi
| Released
| –
|-
| January 2017
| MF
|  Ali Hosni
|  Al-Arabi
|Loan
|-
| June 2017
| GK
|  Noor Sabri
| Released
|  –
|-
| August 2017
| FW
|  Ahmed Yasser
|   Al-Masry
| End of loan

Technical staff

Top scorers

Last updated: 20 August 2017

Clean sheets

Last updated: 14 August 2017

Penalties

Overall statistics

Last updated: 20 August 2017

Sources
 FIFA.COM 
 Iraqi League 2015/2016
 Al-Minaa SC: Transfers and News

Al-Mina'a SC seasons
Al Mina